Beat Bobby Flay is an American cooking competition show on the Food Network. It features various chefs competing against Bobby Flay. The show is taped in front of a live audience.

Format 
In the first round, two guests, often a celebrity chef and a friend of Flay, introduce two contestants who cook for 20 minutes against each other using an ingredient chosen by Flay. The guests then determine who cooked the better dish and will face Flay in the second round. The winning contestant then chooses a dish for both the contestant and Flay to cook in the second round which lasts for 45 minutes.  The winner of the second round is determined by three judges in a blind taste test. Through 404 competitions, Bobby Flay's win–loss record is 252-152 (a 62.4% win percentage).

The presentation of Beat Bobby Flay borrows from boxing matches, with a bell rung to indicate the start of rounds and mild or humorous trash talking by Flay, competing chefs and guest judges. During both rounds, the celebrity judges will periodically walk into the cooking area to talk to each chef about their strategy; in the second round, they will also make light-hearted attempts to distract Flay. At the end of each episode, if the contestant wins, then he or she gets to tell everyone that they Beat Bobby Flay. If Bobby wins, he makes a felicitous joke as he runs off the set.

Episodes

Season 1

Season 2

Season 3

Season 4

Season 5

Season 6

Season 7

Season 8

Season 9

Season 10

Season 11

Season 12

Season 13

Season 14

Season 15

Season 16

Season 17

Season 18

Season 19

Season 20

Season 21

Season 22

Season 23

Season 24

Season 25

Season 26

Season 27

Season 28

Season 29

Season 30

Season 31

Season 32

References

External links 
 

2013 American television series debuts
2010s American cooking television series
Food Network original programming